Karien Robbers (born 16 August 1993) is a Dutch rower. She competed in the women's coxless pair event at the 2016 Summer Olympics.

References

External links
 

1993 births
Living people
Dutch female rowers
Olympic rowers of the Netherlands
Rowers at the 2016 Summer Olympics
Place of birth missing (living people)